The Moderate Party is a liberal-conservative major political party in Sweden.

Moderate Party may also refer to:

Moderate Party (Illinois), a former political party made by Bill Scheurer for his campaign for the U.S. House in 2006
Moderate Party of Rhode Island, the third largest political party in Rhode Island
Moderate Party (Scotland), a group of clerics in the Church of Scotland in the 18th century
Moderate Party (Spain), a political party in 19th-century Spain
Social Democratic Party (Estonia), known as the Moderates between 1996 and 2004
Moderate Party (Brazil), a nineteenth-century political party in Brazil
Moderates of Åland, a political party in Finland
Moderates and Populars, a political party in Italy
Moderate Socialists Party, a historic party in Persia
Moderates (Italy), a political party in Italy
Moderate leaders, a group of former political leaders in India active between 1885 and 1905.
Ontario Moderate Party, a political party in the Canadian province of Ontario
Moderate Party (Italy), a historic party in Italy
Moderates (Denmark), a political party founded by former prime minister Lars Løkke Rasmussen
Moderate Party (New Jersey), a political party seeking to restore fusion voting in New Jersey founded in 2022

See also 
Centre-left politics
Centre-right politics